The 1952 Tokachi earthquake, occurred at  on 4 March in the sea near Tokachi District, Hokkaidō, Japan. It had a magnitude of 8.1 on the moment magnitude scale.

Damage
There was earthquake and tsunami damage in an area ranging from Hokkaido to the northern part of the Tohoku region. As a result, 28 people were killed, five were missing, and 287 were wounded. In addition, 815 houses were completely destroyed, 1324 half-damaged, and 6395 partially damaged. Ninety-one houses were swept away, 328 suffered flooding, 20 were lost to fire, and 1621 became uninhabitable. Furthermore, 451 ships were damaged.

In Hamanaka, in the Akkeshi District, Hokkaidō, a tsunami destroyed numerous homes. It is thought that drift ice was pushed up by the tsunami and exacerbated the damage. Eight years later, this area was devastated by the tsunami caused by the 1960 Chile earthquake, killing 11 people.
 
This was the first large tsunami after the inception of Japan's tsunami warning system. The previous day, March 3, was the anniversary of the 1933 Sanriku earthquake, and the large number of training and evacuation drills held that day bolstered the response to the real disaster on March 4.

See also
List of earthquakes in 1952
List of earthquakes in Japan

Notes

External links

1952 tsunamis
Earthquakes of the Showa period
Megathrust earthquakes in Japan
1952 earthquakes
1952 in Japan
History of Hokkaido
March 1952 events in Asia
1952 disasters in Japan